You Said may refer to:

 You Said (album), by Jermaine Jackson
 "You Said" (song), by Farmer's Daughter
 "You Said", by Ryan Adams, from the album Prisoner (B-Sides)